is a Japanese singer and former member of the J-pop group NEWS, as part of Johnny's Entertainment, Inc., which he joined in February 2001.

Biography 
As a Johnny's Jr., Kusano had also been in other Jr. subgroups including J2000, J-support, and K.K.Kity, before he was selected as one of the nine members to debut as NEWS in 2003 along with Tomohisa Yamashita, Takahisa Masuda, Shigeaki Kato, Yuya Tegoshi, Ryo Nishikido, Keiichiro Koyama, Hiroki Uchi and Takahiro Moriuchi.

After recent news that Uchi and Kusano would be performing in "Shounentai Playzone 2007" (少年隊 PLAYZONE 2007) with other Juniors from Johnny's Entertainment, it was shortly thereafter conformed during the press conference for the recently announced Fuji TV drama "Isshun no Kaze ni Nare" (一瞬の風になれ), that Hiroki Uchi, along with Hironori Kusano, had officially graduated from their "trainee" status within Johnny's Entertainment.

Dramas
 Gekidan Engimono (劇団演技者) (2005), Ep. 13 Ie ga Tooi (家が遠い) – (A short 4-part series which also starred fellow group members Takahisa Masuda, Yuya Tegoshi, and Shigeaki Kato)

Radio shows
 News Kick and Spin Muzik as DJ, (was broadcast Thursdays @ 21:25~21.45)

Television
 The Shonen Club
 Ya-Ya-yah
 Hadaka no Shonen

Stage plays
 Playzone 2007 Change2Chance

References

External links
  
 Official blog 

1988 births
Living people
People from Yokohama
Japanese male pop singers
Japanese idols
News (band) members
Johnny & Associates
Musicians from Kanagawa Prefecture
21st-century Japanese singers
21st-century Japanese male singers